The North Lincolnshire Council election took place on as part of English local elections on 5 May 2011, with all 43 members up for election. Defending a majority of one, the Labour Party lost control of the council to the Conservatives, who won with a majority of three seats in the only Conservative council gain from Labour in the country.

Election result

The changes above is the difference from the previous full council election, although after a mid-term defection from the Liberal Democrats to the Conservatives, the Liberal Democrats were not defending any seats.

Ward results

Ashby
Ashby elected three members, with Labour winning all three seats. John Collinson, Andrea Davison and Michael Grant were elected.

Axholme Central
Axholme Central elected two members, Conservative David Robinson and leader of the Conservative group Liz Redfern.

Axholme North
Axholme North elected two members, Conservative John Briggs and Labour candidate Trevor Barker.

Axholme South
Axholme South elected two members, Conservatives Ron Allcock and William Eckhardt.

Barton
The Barton ward elected three members, Conservatives Paul Vickers, Keith Vickers and Jonathan Evison.

Bottesford
Bottesford elected three members, Conservative candidate Jean Bromby and Labour candidates Stephen Swift and David Whiteley.

Brigg and Wolds
The Brigg and Wolds ward elected three members, Conservatives Carl Sherwood, Nigel Sherwood and Rob Waltham.

Broughton and Appleby
Broughton and Appleby elected two members, Conservatives Arthur Bunyan and Ivan Glover.

Brumby
Brumby elected three members, with Labour winning all three seats. Len Foster, Pauline Carlile and Sue Armitage were elected.

Burringham and Gunness
Burringham and Gunness elected just a single member, Labour candidate Dave Oldfield.

Burton upon Stather and Winterton
Burringham and Stather and Winterton elected three members, Conservative candidates Elaine Marper, Ralph Ogg and Helen Rowson.

Crosby and Park
The Crosby and Park ward elected three members, Labour candidates Jawaid Ishaq, Mark Kirk and Christine O'Sullivan.

References

2011 English local elections
2011
2010s in Lincolnshire